Bangon Pilipinas Party (BPP) or Bangon is a political party in the Philippines, formed in 2004 as the Bangon Pilipinas Movement. It is the political vehicle of its leader, televangelist Eddie Villanueva. Villanueva ran for president on 2004 and 2010, but lost on both elections. The party put up a senatorial slate for the 2010 elections but none of its candidates won.

Villanueva's son, Eduardo "Jon-Jon" Villanueva, Jr. was the highest ranking elected official of the party, serving as mayor of Bocaue, Bulacan; he ran as the Liberal Party's candidate for mayor in the 2013 elections and won.

In the 2016 Senate election, the party endorsed another Villanueva son, then TESDA Director General Joel Villanueva. He won the second highest number of votes in that election.

Candidates for Philippine general elections, 2010

Eddie Villanueva- Presidential Candidate (lost)
Perfecto R. Yasay, Jr. – Vice-Presidential Candidate (lost)

Senators:
Kata Inocencio (lost) 
Alex Tinsay (lost) 
Imelda Papin (lost) 
Israel Virgines (lost) 
Reynaldo Princessa (lost) 
Zosimo Paredes (lost) 
Zafrullah Allonto (lost)
Adz Nikabulin (lost)
Ramoncito Ocampo (lost)

Candidate for the Philippine general election, 2013

Senatorial Slate (1)

Bro. Eddie Villanueva (lost)

Electoral performance

President

Vice president

Senate

House of Representatives

Other
 Eduardo "Jon-Jon/JJV" Villanueva, Jr. is a two-termer mayor of Bocaue, Bulacan. He is the highest-ranking elected officeholder of the party.

See also
Citizens' Battle Against Corruption

References

External links
Bangon Pilipinas official site
Bro. Eddie Villanueva official site

Centrist parties in the Philippines
Christian political parties
Christian democratic parties in Asia
Political parties established in 2004